Vladimir Pavlovich Milyutin (Russian: Влади́мир Па́влович Милю́тин; 5 September 1884 – 30 October 1937) was a Russian Bolshevik leader, Soviet statesman, economist and statistician who was People's Commissar for Agriculture in the original soviet government formed on the day of the Bolshevik Revolution, but resigned in protest against Vladimir Lenin's decision to impose one party rule.

Early career 
Born in the village of Alexandrovo, Kursk Governorate in 1884, into a Jewish family. Milyutin joined the Russian Social Democratic Labour Party (RSDLP) in 1903, and was initially a Menshevik. His membership of the Communist Party was postdated only until 1910, implying that he did not join the Bolshevik faction of the RSDLP until that year. He was a 'conciliator', who hoped to reunite the disparate parts of the party, and in that capacity was co-opted to the Central Committee in 1910, but arrested almost immediately afterwards.  After the February revolution, he was elected chairman of the Saratov Soviet. In August 1917, he was elected a member of the Central Committee of the RSDLP(b), and was based in St Petersburg as one of the most active Bolsheviks leaders for the next three months. 

One week before the Bolshevik Revolution, on 29 October, when Lenin emerged from hiding to urge the Central Committee to ready itself to seize power immediately, Milyutin was the first speaker to oppose him, arguing that power should be - and was being - transferred to the soviets, and not exclusively to the Bolsheviks, and that "we (the Bolsheviks) are not ready to strike the first blow; we are unable to depose and arrest the authorities in the immediate future." But he accepted the majority decision, and played a central role in the Bolshevik coup, in charge of food supplies. On 7 November, he was named People's Commissar for Agriculture in the original Bolshevik government, but he resigned ten days later, along with Lev Kamenev and three others, who called for the Bolsheviks to form a coalition government with the other socialist parties represented in the soviets. They withdrew their resignations on 12 December, and on 15 December, Kamenev and Milyutin were elected to the steering committee of the Bolshevik faction in the Constituent Assembly. Nine days later, the entire steering committee (which included Joseph Stalin) was sacked for being too conciliatory towards the other socialist parties.

Later career 
After his reinstatement, Milyutin never intentionally deviated from the party line again. He advocated ending workers' control of factories, which had sprung up spontaneously during the revolution, because it disrupted production. He also opposed Leon Trotsky over the issue of importance of economic planning, which Milyutin disparaged to the extent that Lenin publicly accused him, in an article published in Pravda in February 1921 of writing "twaddle" and exhibiting "highbrow disdain" for practical achievements. He inadvertently offended Lenin again, in autumn 1922, by proposing an end to the state monopoly on foreign trade, arguing that private cross-border commerce would boost the soviet economy, and reduce smuggling. 

Appointed director of the Central Statistical Administration in 1928, he loyally supported Stalin during the drive to force the peasants to move onto collective farms, and - despite his previous opposition to economic planning - he became an enthusiastic supporter for the first Five Year Plan, "adept at the timely expression of opinions held at the highest level in the party."

Arrest and execution 
Milyutin was arrested on 26 July 1937, on accounts of belonging to a secret counter revolutionary organization, and sentenced to death on 29 October 1937. Before his execution, as was customary, he was photographed for the archives of the NKVD. That last photograph was published by David King in his book Ordinary Citizens. He was rehabilitated in 1956.

References

1880s births
1937 deaths
People from Lgovsky Uyezd
Russian Social Democratic Labour Party members
Old Bolsheviks
Central Committee of the Communist Party of the Soviet Union members
People's commissars and ministers of the Russian Soviet Federative Socialist Republic
People's commissars and ministers of the Soviet Union
Russian Constituent Assembly members
Central Executive Committee of the Soviet Union members
Russian revolutionaries
Russian statisticians
Soviet economists
Great Purge victims from Russia
Soviet rehabilitations